Vladan Tomić (18 May 1967 – 19 October 2016) was a Cypriot international football midfielder and coach.

Born in Ševarice, SR Serbia, SFR Yugoslavia, during his early career he played with North York Rockets in the Canadian Soccer League, and then, in 1990-91 with FK Radnički Niš in the Yugoslav First League, Besides these clubs already mentioned, he also played with FK Mačva Šabac. In 1994 he moved to Cyprus where he represented Aris Limassol, Anorthosis Famagusta and AEL Limassol.

Between 2002 and 2003 he played 5 matches for the Cypriot national team.

After retiring, he became a manager, and had a coaching career in Cameroon. In July 2013, Tomić was named the manager of the Cameroonian side Union Sportive Douala for the 2013-14 season.

He died on October 19, 2016, while in Cyprus. He was buried in the local cemetery of his birthplace, Ševarice, in Serbia.

References

External links
 

1967 births
2016 deaths
Sportspeople from Šabac
Serbian footballers
Yugoslav footballers
Yugoslav expatriate footballers
Cypriot footballers
Cyprus international footballers
Cypriot people of Serbian descent
Association football midfielders
Expatriate soccer players in Canada
Yugoslav expatriate sportspeople in Canada
Canadian Soccer League (1987–1992) players
Cypriot First Division players
North York Rockets players
Yugoslav First League players
FK Radnički Niš players
FK Mačva Šabac players
Aris Limassol FC players
Anorthosis Famagusta F.C. players
AEL Limassol players
Cypriot football managers